The guttulate foliage-gleaner (Syndactyla guttulata) is a species of bird in the family Furnariidae. Until it was pointed out that the word guttulated does not exist in English, it was widely referred to as the guttulated foliage-gleaner.
It is endemic to humid forest growing in the Venezuelan Coastal Range.

References

guttulate foliage-gleaner
Birds of the Venezuelan Coastal Range
guttulate foliage-gleaner
guttulate foliage-gleaner
Taxonomy articles created by Polbot